Henry Dyer was a Scottish engineer.

Henry Dyer may also refer to:

Henry Dyer (American football) (born 1945), former American football running back
Sir Henry Peter Swinnerton-Dyer (born 1927),  English mathematician

See also

Harry Dyer, English rugby league footballer of the 1930s